Jingzhou or Jing Prefecture was a zhou (prefecture) in imperial China, centering on modern Jingchuan County, Gansu, China. It was created in the 5th century by Northern Wei and existed (intermittently) until 1913 after the establishment of the Republic of China.

Geography
The administrative region probably includes parts of modern: 
Under the administration of Pingliang, Gansu:
Jingchuan County
Pingliang
Chongxin County
Huating County
Lingtai County
Under the administration of Xianyang, Shaanxi:
Changwu County
Bin County
Xunyi County
Yongshou County
Under the administration of Guyuan, Ningxia:
Jingyuan County

References
 

Prefectures of the Sui dynasty
Prefectures of the Tang dynasty
Prefectures of Later Tang
Prefectures of Later Zhou
Prefectures of Qi (Five Dynasties)
Prefectures of Later Jin (Five Dynasties)
Prefectures of Later Han (Five Dynasties)
Prefectures of the Song dynasty
Prefectures of the Yuan dynasty
Subprefectures of the Ming dynasty
Departments of the Qing dynasty
Former prefectures in Shaanxi
Former prefectures in Gansu
Former prefectures in Ningxia